The NCAA Men's Division II Indoor Track and Field Championship is an annual collegiate indoor track and field competition organized by the National Collegiate Athletic Association to determine the Division II national champions of seventeen different events. Athlete's individual performances earn points for their institution and the team with the most points receives the NCAA team title in track and field.

The reigning champions are Ashland, who won their first title in 2019.

The most successful programs have been Abilene Christian and St. Augustine's, each with 13 titles at the Division II level (ACU has since joined Division I).

Events

Track events

 
Sprint events
60 meter dash
200 meter dash
400 meter dash

Distance events
800 meter run
Mile run
3,000 meter run
5,000 meter run

Hurdle Events
60 meter high hurdles

Relay events
1,600 meter relay
Distance medley relay

Field events

 
Jumping events
High jump
Pole vault
Long jump
Triple jump

Throwing events
Shot put
Weight throw

Multi-events
Heptathlon

Summary

 † Participation vacated by the NCAA Committee on Infractions.

Champions

Team titles
List updated through 2022.

Individual titles
Note: Top 10 teams only
List updated through 2021.

 Schools highlight in yellow have reclassified athletics from NCAA Division II.

Championship Records

See also
NCAA Men's Indoor Track and Field Championship (Division I, Division III)
NCAA Women's Indoor Track and Field Championship (Division I, Division II, Division III)
NCAA Men's Outdoor Track and Field Championship (Division I, Division II, Division III)
NCAA Women's Outdoor Track and Field Championship (Division I, Division II, Division III)
Pre-NCAA Outdoor Track and Field Champions

References

External links
NCAA Division II men's outdoor track and field

 Indoor
NCAA men Division II
Indoor Track, men's
Men's athletics competitions